Campaign II is an action strategy 3D wargame released by Empire Interactive in 1993. It is the sequel to Campaign.

Plot 
The game is similar to its predecessor but features campaigns from the postwar era, including Korea, Six-Day War, Yom Kippur, Vietnam, Iran–Iraq and the Gulf.

Gameplay 
The player takes command of an armoured force in a military campaign. There are elements of both strategic and arcade play involved—when hostile units approach each other, the game switches to combat mode and the player is given command of an armoured vehicle in the resulting battle.

Reception
Computer Gaming World in March 1994 criticized Campaign IIs "sorry" documentation, inaccurate historical scenarios (the Korean War scenario includes the Pusan Perimeter but not the Battle of Inchon, for example) and tactics, and "marginal" graphics. The magazine concluded that Campaign II failed at being a simulation or an arcade game.

References

External links 
Campaign II at Lemon Amiga

1993 video games
Amiga games
DOS games
Gulf War video games
Korean War video games
Military combat simulators
Video games developed in the United Kingdom
Vietnam War video games
Empire Interactive games